Blood Shack (also known as The Chooper and Curse of the Evil Spirit) is a 1971 American horror film written and directed by Ray Dennis Steckler (under the pseudonym Wolfgang Schmidt), and starring Steckler's then-wife Carolyn Brandt alongside Ron Haydock.

Cast

Production
The film was produced on a budget of "five hundred dollars tops". Filming took place in Pahrump, Nevada, and according to Steckler, the furnishings of the titular shack were property that had been left behind by a previous tenant. The black suit worn by the "Chooper", which was too small for Haydock, was recycled from a previous Steckler production, Lemon Grove Kids Meet the Monsters. The killer was called the "Chooper" after the repetitive "choop" sounds made by the suit's wearer during the "Green Grasshopper" segment of The Lemon Grove Kids.

Release
Under the title "The Chooper" The film received a limited theatrical release, playing in one theater in Denver, Colorado. For home video, the film was cut down from 70 minutes to 55 minutes then re-scored and retitled to "Bloodshack".

References

External links
 

1970s exploitation films
1971 horror films
1971 films
American exploitation films
1970s English-language films
1970s American films